Oliver Emanuel (born 1980) is a British playwright and radio dramatist.

Early life and education
Oliver Emanuel was born in Kent, attended St Gregory's Catholic Comprehensive School in Tunbridge Wells, and studied English and Theatre Studies at University of Leeds. His late mother was a drama teacher and his father is a lawyer.

Career
He was Writer-on-Attachment at the West Yorkshire Playhouse in 2006 and Writer-in-Residence for BBC Radio 4 Children in Need in 2010. He has lived in Glasgow since 2006. He is Reader of Playwriting at the University of St Andrews, an Associate Playwright at Playwrights' Studio Scotland, and Writer-in-Residence at Gladstone's Library.

In addition to his radio and stage plays below, Oliver Emanuel has written two plays for Polmont Young Offenders Institute, Ship of Shadows (October 2009) and John (7 May 2010), and scripted the short film This Way Up.

Works

Radio plays

Theatre
{| class="wikitable sortable" cellpadding="4" style="font-size: 100%; border:2; background: #f9f9f9"
|+ Stage plays written by Oliver Emanuel
! Date !! Title !! Director !! class="unsortable" | Cast !! class="unsortable" |  Theatre Company !! class="unsortable" | Notes

|- id="Gemini"
|  – 
| Gemini
| 
| Victoria Glass and Claire Davies
| Stage By Stage
| 
|- id="Iz"
|  – 
| rowspan=2 | Iz  
| rowspan=2 | 
| Grae Cleugh and Nick Jesper
| Silver Tongue Theatre / Pleasance Theatre
| rowspan=2 | 
|- id="Iz 2"
|  – 
| Grae Cleugh and James Gitsham
| Silver Tongue Theatre / Tron Theatre, Glasgow
|- id="Shiver"
|  – 
| rowspan=2 | Shiver 
| rowspan=2 | 
| Kay Bridgeman and Grae Cleugh
| Silver Tongue Theatre / Pleasance Courtyard
| rowspan=2 | 
|-
|  – 
| Marcia Battise
| Theatre 503
|- id="Bella and the Beautiful Knight"
|  – 
| rowspan=2 | Bella and the Beautiful Knight 
| rowspan=2 | 
| rowspan=2 | Grae Cleugh, Sally Kent, Nicholas Cowell
| Silver Tongue Theatre / Gilded Balloon Teviot
| rowspan=2 | 
|-
|  – 
| Tron Theatre, Glasgow
|- id="Magpie Park"
|  – 
| Magpie Park 
| 
| Alison Pargeter and Liam McKenna 
| West Yorkshire Playhouse, Leeds
| 
|- id="Man Across the Way"
|  – 
| Man Across the Way 
| 
| Grae Cleugh, Nicholas Cowell, John Milroy and Harriette Quarrie
| Silver Tongue Theatre and Theatre 503
| 
|- id="The Severed Head of Comrade Bukhari"
|  – 
| rowspan=2 |  
| rowspan=2 | 
| Arches Theatre, Glasgow
| rowspan=2 | 
| rowspan=2 | 
|-
|  – 
| Traverse Theatre, Edinburgh
|- id="Flit"
|  – 
| Flit
| 
| 
| National Theatre of Scotland
| 
|- id="Videotape"
|  – 
| Videotape 
| 
| Robbie Jack and Sam Young
| Òran Mór, Glasgow
| 
|- id="One night in Iran 2"
|  – 
| One night in Iran 
| 
| Nabil Stuart and Amiera Darwish
| Òran Mór, Glasgow
| 
|- id="Henry & Ingrid: Some Words For Home"
| 
| Henry & Ingrid: Some Words For Home
|
|
| Tron Theatre, Glasgow
|
|- id="Spirit of Adventure"
|  – 
| Spirit of Adventure 
| 
| 
| Dundee Rep / Òran Mór, Glasgow
|
|- id="Random Objects Flying Through The Air"
|  – 
| Random Objects Flying Through The Air
| 
| 
| Royal Conservatoire of Scotland / Playwrights' Studio, Scotland
| 
|- id="End of The World"
|  – 
| End of The World
| 
| 
| Red Note Ensemble
| 
|- id="Titus"
|  – 
| Titus
| 
| 
| Macrobert / Playwrights' Studio, Scotland / Imaginate / Edinburgh Festival Fringe 
| New English version of Jan Sobrie's text.
|- id="The Day I Swapped My Dad for Two Goldfish"
|  – 
| 
| 
| 
| National Theatre of Scotland 
| Adaptation of the book by Neil Gaiman and Dave McKean (created by Lu Kemp and Abigail Docherty)
|- id="Dragon"
|  – 
| Dragon
| 
| 
| Vox Motus / National Theatre of Scotland / Tianjin People's Arts Theatre, China
| Conceived by Jamie Harrison, Oliver Emanuel and Candice Edmunds
|- id="The Little Boy That Santa Claus Forgot"
|  – 
|  
| 
| David Ireland and Alasdair Hankinson
| MacrobertThe Arches, Glasgow
| Co-created with Gareth Nicholls
|- id="The Adventures of Robin Hood"
|  – 
| 
| 
| 
| Visible Fictions
| 
|- id="The Lost Things"
|  – 
|  
| 
| Arran Howie and Alex Bird
| Tortoise in a Nutshell
| 
|- id="Prom"
|  – 
| rowspan=2 | Prom 
| rowspan=2 | 
| rowspan=2 | Ryan Fletcher, Helen MacKay, Martin McBride and Nicola Roy
| A Play, a Pie and a PintÒran Mór, Glasgow
| rowspan=2 | 
|-
|  – 
| Traverse Theatre, Edinburgh
|- id="The 306: Dawn"
|  – 
|  
| 
| Scott Gilmour, Josef Davies and Joshua Miles
| National Theatre of Scotland, Perth Theatre with funding from 14–18 NOW
| Composed by Gareth Williams
|- id="The 306: Day"
|  – 
|  
| 
| Dani Heron, Amanda Wilkin, Fletcher Mathers, Wendy Somerville, Angela Hardie and Steven Miller
| National Theatre of Scotland, Perth Theatre and Stellar Quines Theatre Company with funding from 14–18 NOW
| Composed by Gareth Williams
|- id="Flight"
|  – 
| rowspan=5 | Flight <ref>{{Cite web |url=https://www.thestage.co.uk/reviews/2017/flight-review-church-hill-theatre-edinburgh-deeply-important-innovative |title=Flight review at Church Hill Theatre, Edinburgh – 'deeply important and innovative''' – Anna Winter, The Stage, 7 August 2017 |access-date=27 October 2021 |archive-date=15 May 2018 |archive-url=https://web.archive.org/web/20180515202251/https://www.thestage.co.uk/reviews/2017/flight-review-church-hill-theatre-edinburgh-deeply-important-innovative/ |url-status=live }}</ref>
| rowspan=5 |  and 
| rowspan=5 | Nalini Chetty, Farshid Rokey, Emun Elliott, Maryam Hamidi, Robert Jack, Rosalind Sydney, Waleed Akhtar and Adura Odashile
Herald Angel Award 2017.
| Vox MotusChurch Hill Theatre, Edinburgh
| rowspan=5 | Based on the novel Hinterland by Caroline Brothers
|-
|  – 
| McKittrick Hotel, New York 
|-
|  – 
| Melbourne International Arts Festival 
|-
|  – 
| Brighton Festival 
|-
|  – 
| ASU Gammage 
|- id="The 306: Dusk"
|  – 
|  
| 
| Sarah Kameela Impey, Ryan Fletcher and Danny Hughes
| National Theatre of Scotland, Perth Theatre with funding from 14–18 NOW
| Composed by Gareth Williams
|- id="The Monstrous Heart"
|  – 
| rowspan=2 |  <ref>[https://www.thestage.co.uk/reviews/2019/monstrous-heart-review-traverse-theatre-edinburgh The Monstrous Heart review at Traverse Theatre, Edinburgh – 'overwrought and awkward' – Fergus Morgan, The Stage, 24 October 2019]</ref>
| rowspan=2 | 
| rowspan=2 | Charlene Boyd, Christine Entwisle and Tanya Moodie
| Stephen Joseph Theatre, Scarborough
| rowspan=2 | 
|-
|  – 
| Traverse Theatre, Edinburgh

|}

Short storiesNude 

Other work
 Desperate Run 

AwardsDaniel and Mary received a Bronze Sony Radio Academy Award for Best Drama in 2010.Dragon won Best Show For Children and Young People at the UK Theatre Awards in 2014.
His version of Titus won the People's Choice Victor Award in 2015 at IPAY.A History of Paper was shortlisted for the Tinniswood Award 2017.When The Pips Stop won the Tinniswood Award in 2019.The Truth About Hawaii'' won the BBC Audio Drama Award for Best Original Series or Serial in 2019.

References

External links
Oliver Emanuel

Oliver Emanuel at United Agents
Oliver Emanuel at Oberon Books

Alumni of the University of East Anglia
Alumni of the University of Leeds
British dramatists and playwrights
British radio writers
Living people
People from Kent
1980 births
British male dramatists and playwrights